Christopher Ehret (born 27 July 1941), who currently holds the position of Distinguished Research Professor at UCLA, is an American scholar of African history and African historical linguistics particularly known for his efforts to correlate linguistic taxonomy and reconstruction with the archeological record.  He has published ten books, most recently History and the Testimony of Language (2011) and A Dictionary of Sandawe (2012), the latter co-edited with his wife, Patricia Ehret. He has written around seventy scholarly articles on a wide range of historical, linguistic, and anthropological subjects.  These works include monographic articles on Bantu subclassification; on internal reconstruction in Semitic; on the reconstruction of proto-Cushitic and proto-Eastern Cushitic; and, with Mohamed Nuuh Ali, on the classification of the Soomaali languages.  He has also contributed to a number of encyclopedias on African topics and on world history.

Career
Ehret's historical books emphasize early African history. In An African Classical Age (1998) he argues for a conception of the period from 1000 BC to 400 AD in East Africa as a "classical age" during which a variety of major technologies and social structures first took shape. His Civilizations of Africa: A History to 1800 (2002), brings together the whole of African history from the close of the last ice age down to the end of the eighteenth century. With the archaeologist Merrick Posnansky, he also edited The Archaeological and Linguistic Reconstruction of African History (1982), at that time a state-of-the-field survey of the correlation of linguistic and archaeological findings in the different major regions of the continent.

In reviewing An African Classical Age for the Annuals of the American Academy, Ronald Atkinson calls it "not easy or light reading", but concludes that "the result is a remarkably rich, evocative social and cultural history…” and that it "will itself become a classic and shape future scholarship in early African history for many years to come". The late Kennell Jackson of Stanford, writing in The Historian, says that "by the book’s midpoint, the immensity of his synthesis becomes apparent, as well as Ehret’s achievement as a historical conceptualizer.  He repeatedly challenges formulaic ideas about causality, linearity as a model of change, and the cultural factors affecting innovation…. Ehret has written a fabulous African history book, furthering a genre far from the seemingly ubiquitous slavery studies and trendy colonial social history". Peter Robertshaw in the Journal of the Royal Anthropological Institute, offers a more measured conclusion:  "Ehret has produced a remarkably coherent and detailed history which should spur further research".

The historian Esperanza Brizuela-Garcia, in her review of The Civilizations of Africa for the African Studies Review, calls this book "challenging and innovative" for presenting "the early history of Africa within the context of wide historical processes such as the development of agriculture, the emergence of metalwork, and the evolution of trade…. It gives these themes a thorough and masterful treatment…. By looking at broad themes of the history of human experience, Ehret is able to explain what makes Africa unique and what makes it comparable to other continents".  She concludes: "The most important achievement of Ehret’s book is that finally the early history of the continent is taken seriously and is presented in detail and form that do justice to its complexity and depth.  One hopes that Christopher Ehret has initiated a new trend in the writing of African history textbooks, one that challenges previously accepted chronologies and ideas and presents us with an interpretation that connects social, economic, political, and cultural history".

Scott MacEachern's review of the same book for the Journal of Africa History adds an archaeologist's perspective:  "The book is well written and comprehensive and abundantly illustrates the richness and complexity of African societies over many thousands of years.  More discussion of methodologies and data compatibility, and a more complete reference list, would have been useful.  It will make a fine introductory text for courses in African history, especially if supplemented by books and papers that reflect other research methods and their results". 
	
Ehret's linguistic tome, Reconstructing Proto-Afroasiatic (Proto-Afrasian): Vowels, Tone, Consonants, and Vocabulary (1995), is the subject of a detailed review article in Afrika und Übersee by the distinguished scholar of Afroasiatic languages, Ekkehard Wolff.  Wolff writes:  "Ehrets opus magnum ist ein Parforce-Ritt durch schwierigstes Terrain, bei dem sich der Reiter auch an die steilsten Hindernissen überraschend gut in Sattel hält und an nur einer einzigen Hürde nach Meinung des Rez. scheitert (…Tonalität).  Es ist ein nahezu unmöglisches, ein sehr mutiges und ein möglicherweise epochales Buch".  ("Ehret’s opus magnum is a steeplechase ride through the most difficult terrain, in which the rider stays in the saddle astonishingly well even at the steepest obstacles and, in the opinion of the reviewer, crashes at only a single hurdle (…tone).  It is a nearly impossible, a very courageous, and a possibly epochal book".) After an extensive and thorough critical commentary on the contents of the book, Wolff concludes:  "Ehret hat nichts weniger versucht als einen zukünftigen "Klassiker" zu schreiben....” ("Ehret has sought to write nothing less than a future "Classic"....)

This particular book appeared in the same year as another comparative work on the same language family, Vladimir Orel and Olga Stolbova's Hamito-Semitic Etymological Dictionary: Materials for a Reconstruction.  Two reviewers have given comparative assessments of the two books, John Greppin in the Times Literary Supplement, 1 November 1996, and Robert Ratcliffe in a paper, "Afroasiatic Comparative Lexica: Implications for Long (and Medium) Range Language Comparison".  Greppin writes a strongly positive review; Ratcliffe takes a more negative stance toward both books.

Ehret's 2001 book, A Historical-Comparative Reconstruction of Nilo-Saharan, has had a mixed reception.  Václav Blažek, in a review article originally prepared for Afrikanische Arbeitspapiere, presents additional data, most of which, in his words, "confirm Ehret’s cognate sets".  He continues, "The weakest point in the…monograph consists in semantics.  Ehret’s approach is rather benevolent ….  But in any case, in the present time Ehret’s work signifies big progress". The sociologist and linguist Gerard Philippson in his review in the Journal of African Languages and Linguistics, also raises questions on some of the semantic connections, and he has doubts about the environments of certain sound changes proposed in the book.  He has issues as well with Ehret's use of evidence from the Central Sudanic branch of the Nilo-Saharan family, but he finds his arguments relating to the Eastern Sahelian (Eastern Sudanic) branch convincing and "solid".  He avers in conclusion: "Même les chercheurs s'opposant à cette reconstruction disposeront, en tous cas, d'une somme de matériaux, clairement présentés dans l'ensemble, sur lesquels ils pourront s'appuyer pour mettre en cause ou rebâtir l'ensemble proposé.  Il s'agit de toutes façons d'un travail qui ne saurait être ignoré." ("Even the researchers who are opposed to this reconstruction will have, in any case, an amount of material, clearly presented throughout, which they can rely on to either challenge or rebuild what is proposed. As a whole, it constitutes a work which cannot be ignored".) Roger Blench, a development anthropologist, published a critical comparison of Ehret's and M. L. Bender's comparative work on the Nilo-Saharan family in Africa und Übersee in 2000—from its date, seemingly written before the book came out.  It may be based, in part, on a preliminary manuscript by Ehret from the early 1990s.

Recent years
In recent years Ehret has carried his work in several new directions. One of these has been the history and evolution of early human kinship systems. A second interest has been to apply the methods of historical reconstruction from linguistic evidence to issues in anthropological theory and in world history. He has also collaborated with geneticists in seeking to correlate linguistic with genetic findings (e.g., Sarah A. Tishkoff, Floyd A. Reed, F. R. Friedlaender, Christopher Ehret, Alessia Ranciaro, et al., "The Genetic Structure and History of Africans and African Americans", Science 324, 22 May 2009) and in developing mathematical tools for dating linguistic history (e.g., Andrew Kitchen, Christopher Ehret, Shiferew Assefa, and Connie Mulligan, "Bayesian phylogenetic analysis of Semitic languages identifies an Early Bronze Age origin of Semitic in the Near East," Proceedings of the Royal Society B: Biological Sciences, July 2009).

Books
 The Civilizations of Africa: A History to 1800.  Second Edition.  Charlottesville: University of Virginia Press, 2016.
 A Dictionary of Sandawe: The Lexicon and Culture of a Khoesan People of Tanzania. (C. Ehret and Patricia Ehret, eds.) Köln: Rüdiger Köppe Verlag, 2012.
 History and the Testimony of Language. Berkeley, Los Angeles, London: University of California Press, 2011.
 The Civilizations of Africa: A History to 1800.  Charlottesville: University Press of Virginia, 2002.
 A Historical-Comparative Reconstruction of Nilo-Saharan.  Cologne: Rüdiger Köppe Verlag, 2001.
 An African Classical Age: Eastern and Southern Africa in World History, 1000 B.C. to A.D. 400.  Charlottesville: University Press of Virginia, 1998.
 Reconstructing Proto-Afroasiatic (Proto-Afrasian): Vowels, Tone, Consonants, and Vocabulary. Berkeley, Los Angeles: University of California Press, 1995.
 The Archaeological and Linguistic Reconstruction of African History. (C. Ehret and M. Posnansky, eds.) Berkeley, Los Angeles: University of California Press, 1982.
 The Historical Reconstruction of Southern Cushitic Phonology and Vocabulary. Berlin: Reimer, 1980.
 Ethiopians and East Africans: The Problem of Contacts. Nairobi: East African Publishing House, 1974.
 Southern Nilotic History: Linguistic Approaches to the Study of the Past. Evanston, IL: Northwestern University Press, 1971.

References

External links
 His works
 A Conversation with Christopher Ehret, World History Connected Vol. 2 No. 1 (November 2004)
 Reviews of An African Classical Age, 2007

University of California, Los Angeles faculty
Linguists of Khoisan languages
Historians of Africa
Living people
21st-century American historians
American male non-fiction writers
Paleolinguists
Linguists of Nilo-Saharan languages
Linguists of Afroasiatic languages
1941 births
Historical linguists
Historians from California
21st-century American male writers